Paradeucalion is a  beetle genus in the family Cerambycidae described by Stephan von Breuning in 1950. Its contains the following species:

Paradeucalion desertarum Wollaston, 1854
Paradeucalion maderense Krátký & Aguiar, 2019

References

Parmenini
Beetles described in 1854